"Little by Little" is a song by English rock band Oasis, first released as the sixth track on their fifth studio album, Heathen Chemistry. In September 2002, it was released with "She Is Love" as the first (and only) double A-side single by the band, peaking at number two on the UK Singles Chart and number nine on the Irish Singles Chart. "Little by Little" by itself reached number two on the Canadian Singles Chart and number five in Italy. Noel Gallagher provides lead vocals on both tracks, which he also wrote.

The promo video to the song featured a guest role by Robert Carlyle. The cover art for the single is an homage to Robert Indiana's Love artwork series.

Background
Liam Gallagher was originally meant to record lead vocals for "Little by Little", but according to Noel, he couldn't manage it. "It's a shame 'cos that would have made it extra, extra special. When it came to him (recording the vocals) you could see he was going, 'I'm not going to fucking get it.' And we were all willing him to get it. I went in and did a version and you could see he was sat at the desk going, 'Fucking bastard. He's got it.' But he doesn't want to do anything that's shit."

Music video
There are two versions of the music video, one being Noel Gallagher sitting on a doorstep singing and playing guitar as people (including Gem Archer) throw money to him. A small man (played by Robert Carlyle) mimes to Gallagher. It then shows Carlyle's character at a bus stop with Alan White and then grows to normal size and trips over but is helped up by Liam Gallagher. Carlyle's character is then last seen growing to giant size, walking into a forest and then into farmland. The alternate version shows the band playing in a concert at Finsbury Park in 2002.

Track listings
 UK 7-inch single and European CD single 
 "Little by Little"
 "She Is Love"

 UK 12-inch and CD single, Australian CD single 
 "Little by Little"
 "She Is Love"
 "My Generation"

 UK and European DVD single 
 "Little by Little"
 "Little by Little" (demo)
 10 Minutes of Noise and Confusion Pt. 3 (Finsbury Park, London, July 2002)

 European CD single—Special Tour Edition 
 "Little by Little"
 "My Generation"
 "Columbia" (live)
 "Little by Little" (live video) (Finsbury Park, London, July 2002)

Personnel
Oasis
 Noel Gallagher – lead vocals and acoustic guitar
 Gem Archer – electric guitar
 Andy Bell – bass
 Alan White – drums and tambourine

Additional musicians
 Paul Stacey – organ

Charts

Weekly charts

Year-end charts

Certifications

Release history

References

2002 singles
Oasis (band) songs
Song recordings produced by Andy Bell (musician)
Song recordings produced by Gem Archer
Song recordings produced by Liam Gallagher
Song recordings produced by Noel Gallagher
Songs written by Noel Gallagher